Uwe Lyko (born 22 September 1954 in Duisburg) is a German comedian and cabaretist.

Life 
Lyko works in Germany as comedian and cabaretist. He became popular on German television cabaret and comedy shows. Herbert Knebel is one of his most famous characters.

External links 
 Official website by Herbert Knebel
 Official website Herbert Knebels Affentheater
 Herbert-Knebel-Buch beim Henselowsky Boschmann Verlag

References 

German male comedians
1954 births
Living people